"Rock the House" is a song from Gorillaz' self-titled debut album. It was released as the third single from the album in October 2001. It peaked at number 18 on the UK Singles Chart. The song features a horn section loop sampled from "Modesty Blaise", a piece by British jazz musician John Dankworth. Rapper Del the Funky Homosapien is the only artist to provide vocals for the song.

Music video
The music video for "Rock the House" was directed by Jamie Hewlett and Pete Candeland. The inspiration for the video is said to have come from Hewlett's angst at the time, as the band was going through the process of being sued by another band named Monkey Tennis, nicknamed the Doppelgangerz in Rise of the Ogre, who claimed that Gorillaz was a stolen idea.

It starts with a shot of the gate of Kong Studios. The camera then follows Noodle on a tricycle through the hallways of the building. It leads past a door to a room where Gorillaz are performing. A white mist appears among them and Russel passes out. Then the floor has turned into the ghost of Del, who rises up and throws the Gorillaz to the ground. Del is outfitted with protective gear including a helmet. In Rise of the Ogre it explains he is dressed as Mr. Freedom. Del takes a few steps when from behind him a series of spring-loaded guns shoot billiard balls at him, but he diverts them with his glove. A series of inflatable female gorillas appear and start to do cheerleading. 2-D is dodging the balls being shot at him by doing dance moves, but then he is hit by a few balls and knocked out. Murdoc then begins to divert the balls with a padded jockstrap he is wearing, hitting them away with his pelvic thrusts. He is successful a dozen times until a ball ricochets off the padded wall and hits his unprotected buttocks. The ball ricochets and hits Russel in the head, waking him up and making Del disappear. Russel looks around, noticing 2-D laying on the floor, Murdoc is standing bowlegged, and Noodle smiling and holding her guitar. The final shot is simply the introduction, but reversed.

Track listing
CD1
 "Rock the House" (radio edit) – 3:03
 "The Sounder" (edit) – 4:29
 "Faust" – 3:51
 "Rock the House Teaser Trailer" (video) – 0:29

CD2
 "Rock the House" (album version) – 4:09
 "Ghost Train" – 3:54
 "19-2000" – 3:30
 "19-2000 Geep Sim Trailer" (video) – 0:10
 "19-2000" (music video) – 4:00

European CD
 "Rock the House" (album version) – 4:09
 "The Sounder" – 6:16

Cassette single
 "Rock the House" (radio edit) – 3:03
 "The Sounder" (edit) – 4:29
 "Ghost Train" – 3:54

Promotional 12-inch vinyl
 "Rock the House" (album version) – 4:09
 "The Sounder" (edit) – 4:29
 "Faust" – 3:51
 "Ghost Train" – 3:54

Fictional background
In Rise of the Ogre, 2-D claims to have "played some divvy panpipes" for "Rock the House" during a track-by-track of the Gorillaz album. Murdoc is stunned by this and repeats his disbelief briefly during the section on the video. Though the track was selected for a single and received generally good reactions, Rise of the Ogre claims that Gorillaz were never particularly satisfied with "Rock the House", with Murdoc expressing his opinions by claiming he "won this song in a raffle" and 2-D thinking that the track should not have made it on the album at all. For the radio edit of the song, the line which features the words "Shake your ass-crack" is cut. Instead, the edit features the orchestral type sound, which features after the trumpet riff at the start of the song, so that the last two words are not heard.

Personnel
Del the Funky Homosapien – vocals
Damon Albarn – flute, piano
Dan the Automator – sampled loops
Junior Dan – bass guitar
Tom Girling – Pro Tools, engineering
Jason Cox – engineering
Howie Weinberg – mastering

References

2000 songs
2001 singles
Del the Funky Homosapien songs
Gorillaz songs
Parlophone singles
Rap rock songs
Songs written by Damon Albarn
Songs written by Jamie Hewlett